Bonn is a German surname. Notable people with the surname include:

Ferdinand Bonn (1861–1933), German actor
Gisela Bonn (1909–1996), German journalist, writer, environmental activist and Indologist
Herb Bonn (1916–1943), American basketball player
John Hillric Bonn (1829–1891), American railroad executive
Skeeter Bonn (1923–1994), American country singer-songwriter and guitarist

German-language surnames